This season progressed without any real level of consistency up until Christmas and the new year. January, February and March however saw eight victories and only two defeats, both against the eventual Champions Cwmavon 5-20 and runners up Pontyberem 0-20. Within this run was a 69-15 home win against Kidwelly, 10 tries were scored, 8 converted by Gareth James, one short of the record 9 held by Leighton Stoneman. This run lifted the side to a creditable 4th place out of 12. Cup performances this year were of no great note. Captain for a second season was Stephen Munkley who also won Players Player of the year. Top points scorer Gareth James with 172 won Supporters Player of the year and Martyn Stoneman scored 7 tries – his last a fine individual effort away at Newcastle Emlyn during injury time. This was the last game of the season, earning a 29 all draw.

National League Division 4 West

Ystalyfera 2000/01 Season Results

Ystalyfera 2000/01 Season Player Stats

References

Sport in Neath Port Talbot